Chîra (Arabic: شيرا) is a Maronite village between the Bsharri District and the Koura District of Lebanon.

References

Maronite Christian communities in Lebanon
Populated places in the North Governorate
Koura District
Bsharri District